North Borneo (usually known as British North Borneo, also known as the State of North Borneo) was a British protectorate in the northern part of the island of Borneo, which is present day Sabah. The territory of North Borneo was originally established by concessions of the Sultanates of Brunei and Sulu in 1877 and 1878 to a German-born representative of Austria-Hungary, a businessman and diplomat, Gustav Overbeck.

Overbeck had recently purchased a small tract of land in the western coast of Borneo in 1876 from American merchant Joseph William Torrey, who had promoted the territory in Hong Kong since 1866.
Overbeck then transferred all his rights to Alfred Dent before withdrawing in 1879. In 1881, Dent established the North Borneo Provisional Association Ltd to manage the territory, which was granted a royal charter in the same year. The following year, the Provisional Association was replaced by the North Borneo Chartered Company. The granting of a royal charter worried both the neighbouring Spanish and Dutch authorities; as a result, the Spanish began to stake their claim of northern Borneo. A protocol known as the Madrid Protocol was signed in 1885 to recognise Spanish presence in the Philippine archipelago, in return establishing the definite border of Spanish influence beyond northern Borneo. To avoid further claims from other European powers, North Borneo was made a British protectorate in 1888.

North Borneo produced timber for export; along with agriculture this industry remained the main economic resource for the British in Borneo. As the population was too small to effectively serve the economy, the British sponsored various migration schemes for Chinese workers from Hong Kong and China to work in the European plantations, and for Japanese immigrants to participate in the economic activities of North Borneo. The starting of World War II with the arrival of Japanese forces however brought an end to protectorate administration, with the territory placed under a military administration and then designated as a crown colony.

History

Foundation and early years 

North Borneo was founded in 1877–1878 through a series of land concessions in northern Borneo from the Sultanate of Brunei and Sulu to an Austrian-German businessman and diplomat, Gustav Overbeck. A former American Trading Company of Borneo territory in the western coast of northern Borneo had already passed to Overbeck, requiring him to go to Brunei to renew the concession of the land he bought from Joseph William Torrey. William Clark Cowie played an important role as a close friend of the Sultanate of Sulu in helping Overbeck to buy additional land in the eastern coast of Borneo. Meanwhile, the Sultanate of Bulungan's influence also reached Tawau in eastern southern coast, but came under the influence of the more dominating Sulu Sultanate.

Following his success in leasing  a large tract of lands from both the western and eastern parts of northern Borneo, Overbeck went to Europe to promote the territory in Austria-Hungary and Italy as well as in his own country of Germany, but none showed any real interest. Only Great Britain, which had sought to control trade routes in the Far East since the 18th century, responded. The interest of the British was strengthened by their presence in the Crown Colony of Labuan since 1846. As a result, Overbeck received financial support from the British Dent brothers (Alfred Dent and Edward Dent) and diplomatic and military support from the British government. Following the entrance of support from the British side, a clause was included in the treaties that the ceded territories could not be sold or given to another party without the permission of the British government.

Unable to attract the interest of the governments of Austria, Italy and Germany, Overbeck withdrew in 1879; all his treaty rights with the Sultanates were transferred to Alfred Dent, who in 1881 formed the North Borneo Provisional Association Ltd with the support of countrymen Rutherford Alcock, Admiral Henry Keppel, Richard Biddulph Martin, Admiral Richard Mayne, and William Henry Read. The Provisional Association then applied to Queen Victoria for a royal charter, which was granted on 1 November 1881. William Hood Treacher was appointed as the first governor, and Kudat at the northern tip of Borneo was chosen as the Provisional Association administration capital. The granting of the royal charter had worried both the Dutch and the Spanish, who feared that Britain might threaten the position of their colonies.

In May 1882, the Provisional Association was replaced by the newly formed North Borneo Chartered Company, with Alcock acting as the first President and Dent becoming the company managing director. The administration is not considered as a British acquisition of the territory, but rather simply as a private enterprise with government guidelines to protect the territory from being encroached upon by other European powers. Under Governor Treacher, the company gained more territories on the western coast from the Sultanate of Brunei. The company subsequently acquired further sovereign and territorial rights from the sultan of Brunei, expanding the territory under control to the Putatan river (May 1884), the Padas district (November 1884), the Kawang river (February 1885), the Mantanani Islands (April 1885) and additional minor Padas territories (March 1898).

At the early stage of the administration, there was a claim in northern Borneo by the Spanish authorities in the Philippines, and an attempt to raise the Spanish flag over Sandakan was met with interference by a British warship. To prevent further conflict and to end the Spanish claim to northern Borneo, in 1885 an agreement known as the Madrid Protocol was signed in Madrid between the United Kingdom, Germany and Spain, recognising the Spanish presence in the Philippine archipelago. As the company did not wish to be involved in further foreign affairs issues, North Borneo was made a British Protectorate on 12 May 1888. In 1890, the Crown Colony of Labuan was incorporated into the administration of North Borneo, before returning to British government direct rule in 1904. There were several local insurrections from 1894 to 1900 by Mat Salleh and by Antanum in 1915. The First World War did not greatly affect the territory, and logging business grew during the interwar period.

World War II and decline 

In World War II, the Japanese invasion of the island of Borneo started with the unopposed landing of the Japanese forces at Miri and Seria on 16 December 1941, with the objective of securing oil supplies. On 1 January 1942, the Japanese navy landed unopposed in Labuan. The next day, 2 January 1942, the Japanese landed at Mempakul on North Borneo territory. After negotiations with the Officers-in-charge of Jesselton as to its surrender, while they were waiting for troop reinforcements, Jesselton was occupied by the Japanese on 8 January. Another strong Japanese army detachment arrived from Mindanao and began to land on Tarakan Island,  before proceeding to Sandakan on 17 January. The Japanese arrival was met with no strong resistance, as the protectorate mainly relied on the Royal Navy for defence. Although North Borneo has a police force, it never had its own army or navy. By the end of January, North Borneo was completely occupied by the Japanese. It was administered as part of the Empire of Japan, with the officers of the chartered company being allowed to continued administration under Japanese supervision.

The arrival of the Japanese forces to Borneo and the fall of Anglo-Japanese Alliance had already been predicted by revelation through secret telegrams that Japanese ships docked regularly at Jesselton were engaged in espionage. Many of the British and Australian soldiers captured after the fall of Malaya and Singapore were brought to North Borneo and held as a prisoners of war (POWs) in Sandakan camp where they were then forced to march from Sandakan to Ranau. Other POWs were also sent to Batu Lintang camp in neighbouring Sarawak. The occupation drove residents in the coastal areas to the interior in searching for food and escaping the brutality during the war period, which led to the creation of several resistance movements; one of the such movement known as the Kinabalu Guerrillas which led by Albert Kwok and supported by indigenous groups in North Borneo.

As part of the Allied Campaign to retake their possessions in the East, Allied forces deployed to Borneo under the Borneo Campaign to liberate the island. The Australian Imperial Force (AIF) played a significant part in the mission, with the force being sent to Tarakan and Labuan islands to secure the east and western Borneo. The Allied Z Special Unit provided intelligence gatherings and other information from the Japanese that could facilitated the AIF landings, while US submarines were used to transport Australian commandos to Borneo. Most of the major towns of North Borneo were heavily bombed during these period. The war ended on 15 August 1945 following the Japanese surrender and the administration of North Borneo was undertaken by the British Military Administration (BMA) from September. The company official administration returned to administer the territory but, unable to finance the reconstruction cost after the war, ceded administration of the protectorate to the crown colony government on 15 July 1946.

Government 

The Chartered Company's system of administration was based on standard British colonial empire administration structures, with the land divided into Residencies, and sub-divided into Districts. Initially, there were only two Residencies: East Coast and West Coast, with Residents based at Sandakan and Jesselton respectively. Each Residency was divided into Provinces, later known as Districts, which were run by district officers. By 1922, there were five Residencies to accommodate new areas that were opened up for development. These were the West Coast, Kudat, Tawau, Interior and East Coast Residencies. These Residencies were in turn divided into 17 districts. Under this system, British held top posts, while native chiefs managed the people at grassroots level. This was not a conscious attempt by the British to instill indirect rule but a convenient arrangement for the district officers who were unfamiliar with local customs and politics.

The company administration established a foundation for economic growth in North Borneo by restoring peace to a land where piracy and tribal feuds had grown rampant. It abolished slavery and set up transport, health and education services for the people, and allowed indigenous communities to continue their traditional lifestyles. The British North Borneo Constabulary, the territory's police force, in 1883 comprised 3 Europeans, 50 Indians (Punjabis and Pashtuns), 30 Dayaks, 50 Somalis and 20 Malays. Constables trained at depot an average of three days per week. In 1884 the force had a total of 176 members, which increased to about 510 over three years. While under the protectorate, international relations fell under the purview of the British government, internally North Borneo was governed by the North Borneo Chartered Company as an independent state with British protection. The treaty signed on 12 May 1888 stipulated:

I. The State of North Borneo comprises the territories specified in the said Royal Charter, and such other territories as the Company have acquired, or may hereafter acquire, ‘under the provisions of Article XV of the said Charter.
It is divided into nine Provinces, namely:

Province Alcock;
Province Cunliffe;
Province Dent;
Province Dewhurst;
Province Elphinstone;
Province Keppel;
Province Martin;
Province Mayne;
Province Myburgh.

II. The State of North Borneo shall continue to be governed and administered as an independent State by the company in conformity with the provisions of the said Charter; under the protection of Great Britain; but such protection shall confer no right on Her Majesty's Government to interfere with the internal administration of the State further than is provided herein or by the Charter of the Company.
III. The relations between the State of North Borneo and all foreign States, including the States of Brunei and of Sarawak, shall be conducted by Her Majesty's Government, or in accordance with its directions; and if any difference should arise between the Government of North Borneo and that of any other State, the Company, as representing the State of North Borneo, agrees to abide by the decision of Her Majesty's Government, and to take all necessary to give effect thereto.

IV. Her Majesty's Government shall have the right to establish British Consular officers in any part of the said territories, who shall receive exequaturs in the name of the Government of North Borneo. They shall enjoy whatever privileges are usually granted to Consular officers, and they shall be entitled to hoist the British flag over their residences and public offices.
V. British subjects, commerce, and shipping shall enjoy the same right, privileges, and advantages as the subjects, commerce, and shipping of the most favoured nation, as well as any other rights, privileges, and advantages which may be enjoyed by the subjects, commerce and shipping of North Borneo.
VI. No cession or other alienation of any part of the territory of the State of North Borneo shall be made by its Government to any foreign State, or the subjects or the citizens thereof, without the consent of Her Majesty's Government; but this restriction shall not apply to ordinary grants or leases of lands or houses to private individuals for purposes of residence, agriculture, commerce, or other business.

Economy 

With the beginning of well-planned economic activities under British administration, the North Borneo authorities began to open land for agriculture, and native land rights began to be formed. The government however felt that the native population was too small and unsuited to meet the requirements of modern development, so they began to sponsor various schemes for the migration of Chinese workers from Hong Kong and China. In 1882, the North Borneo authorities appointed Walter Henry Medhurst as Commissioner for Chinese Immigration in the mission to attract more businessmen to invest in North Borneo by providing a workforce. Medhurst's efforts were costly and unsuccessful; however, the Hakka, not part of the plan, began to migrate to North Borneo where they formed an agricultural community.

Since the 18th century, tobacco was North Borneo's foremost planting industry. The logging history in North Borneo can be traced since the 1870s. From 1890s, hardwood exports increased, with logging expanding especially during the interwar period. In the 1900s, North Borneo joined the rubber boom. The completion of North Borneo Railway Line helped to transport the resources to a major port on the west coast. In the same year, North Borneo Governor Aylmer Cavendish Pearson invited Japanese emigrants to participate in the economic activities there. The Japanese government received the request warmly and send researchers to discover potential economic opportunities.

At the early stage, the Japanese encouraged their farmers to go to North Borneo to cultivate rice, as their country depended on rice imports. With increasing economic interest from the Japanese side, they purchased a rubber estate owned by the North Borneo government. By 1937, North Borneo exported 178,000 cubic metres of timber, surpassing Siam, which exporting 85,000 cubic metres of timber. Many of the privately owned Japanese estates and companies had been involved in the economic sectors of North Borneo since been invited by the British. With the increasing numbers of Japanese investments, many Japanese also migrate with their family to the east coast of North Borneo, primarily to Tawau and Kunak.

Currency 

The original monetary unit of North Borneo was the Mexican dollar, equal to 100 cents. The dollar was later matched to the Straits dollar and rated at 9 Straits dollars (equal to 5 US dollars at the time). Different notes were issued throughout the administration, with backgrounds featuring the Mount Kinabalu or the company arms.

Society

Demography 
In 1881, 60,000 to 100,000 indigenous people lived in North Borneo. The people on the coast were mainly Muslims, with the aborigines mostly located inland. The Kadazan-Dusun and Murut were the largest indigenous group in the interior, while Bajau, Bruneian, Illanun, Kedayan and Suluk dominated the coastal areas. Following various immigration schemes initiated by the British, the population increased to 200,000 in 1920, 257,804 in 1930, 285,000 in 1935, and 331,000 in 1945. Under company rule, the government of North Borneo not only recruited Chinese workers but also Japanese immigrants to overcome the shortage of manpower in the economic sectors. From 1911 until 1951, the total of Chinese population increased from only 27,801 to 74,374 which is divided between Hakka (44,505), Cantonese (11,833), Hokkien (7,336), Teochew (3,948), some Hailam (Hainan) (3,571) and other Chinese groups (3,181).

Public service infrastructure 

North Borneo was connected to the Singapore-Hongkong submarine cable by a link from the island of Labuan to Menumbok. The first message from the Borneo mainland to London was sent on 19 May 1894. A few days later, the work on a telegraph line from the West Coast to Sandakan was started. It took three years and exacted a heavy toll in human life to push the line through the almost uninhabited interior territory, until on 7 April 1897 a congratulatory message from the Governor in Sandakan for transmission to the Court of Directors in London was successfully transmitted from Sandakan to Labuan. In the early 1910s the technical and financial problems with the telegraph line prompted the company to venture into the construction of a wireless network, based on the quench-spark system of the German Telefunken Company. The first stage of this network comprised stations in Sandakan, Jesselton, Tawau and Kudat. The first wireless  communication was established on 24 October 1913 between British North Borneo and Jolo on the Philippine Islands. Inland communication was effected on 14 January 1914 between Sandakan and Jesselton.

The North Borneo Railway opened to the public on 1 August 1914 as the main transportation facility for west coast communities. Postal service was also available throughout the administration.

Media 
The Journal of the Royal Asiatic Society (since 1820) and British North Borneo Herald (since 1883) held a significant amount of records regarding North Borneo before and during the British administration.

See also 
 History of Sabah
 Postage stamps and postal history of North Borneo
 Postal orders of British North Borneo

Notes

Footnotes

References

Further reading

External links 

 North Borneo Historical Society  – More information on heritage of North Borneo

 
1882 establishments in Asia
1882 establishments in the British Empire
States and territories established in 1882
1946 disestablishments in Asia
1946 disestablishments in the British Empire
 
Borneo
 
British rule in Malaysian history
North Borneo
Former countries in Borneo
Former countries in Bruneian history
Former countries in Malaysian history
Former British colonies and protectorates in Asia
History of Sabah
Maritime Southeast Asia
States and territories disestablished in 1946
Disputed territories in Asia
Territorial disputes of the Philippines